Phlegmacium brunneiaurantius is a species of fungus in the family Cortinariaceae.

Taxonomy 
It was originally described in 2014 by the mycologists Ilkka Kytövuori, Kare Liimatainen and Tuula Niskanen who classified it as Cortinarius brunneiaurantium. It was placed in the (subgenus Phlegmacium) of the large mushroom genus Cortinarius.

In 2022 the species was transferred from Cortinarius and reclassified as Phlegmacium brunneiaurantium based on genomic data.

Habitat and distribution 
Found only in south Finland, where it grows in deciduous forests, it was described as new to science in 2014. Close relatives include C. sobrius, C. balteatus, C. brunneoviolaceus, C. pseudonaeovosus and C. clarobaltoides var. longispermus.

See also
List of Cortinarius species

References

External links

brunneiaurantius
Fungi described in 2014
Fungi of Finland